Helene Hecht (born August 19, 1854, in Mainz as Helena Bamberger; died October 22 or 24, 1940) was a German Jewish art collector, salonnière and patron of the arts.

Family 
Helena Bamberger was the daughter of Rudolf Bamberger (born February 4, 1821; died June 7, 1900), born in Mainz, and his Kreuznach-born wife Bertha Bamberger (born December 3, 1827; died September 23, 1915), née Seligmann. She was a niece of the banker and politician Ludwig Bamberger.

Helena Bamberger was from 1875 the wife of the Jewish lawyer, banker and merchant Felix Hecht (* November 27, 1847 in Friedberg; † October 18, 1909 on a trip between Eisenach and Weimar) and the mother of four sons: Hans Paul Jakob Hecht (1876-1946), an English scholar; August Hecht (b. May 24, 1878; d. December 30, 1879); Rudolf Ludwig Hecht (b. October 31, 1880; d. 1959); and Arnold Robert Hecht (b. August 12, 1885; d. April 2, 1886)

In 1871, her husband was the founding director of Rheinische Hypothekenbank and Pfälzische Hypothekenbank in Ludwigshafen am Rhein on the recommendation of Bluntschli's professor Johann Caspar Bluntschli.

Life 
Together with her husband, Felix Hecht, she was involved around 1899 in the founding of the Mannheim Academy of Music, the forerunner of today's State Academy of Music and Performing Arts.

Helene Hecht, who was educated and culturally engaged led together with Berta Hirsch (1850-1913), founder of the first reading hall in Germany, the largest salon in the city of Mannheim. In this salon, Hecht and Hirsch facilitated communication between artists, patrons and city dignataries.

The villa was designed by Rudolf Tillessen in Mannheim. Guests included the composer Johannes Brahms, who was a friend of Hecht's husband, and the painter Franz von Lenbach. The latter made paintings for the Hecht family, which were later looted by the Nazis. They were exhibited at the Great German Art Exhibition in Munich, which is now in Mannheim's Reiss-Engelhorn Museum.

The Hecht villa is now known as Villa Helene, a venue for exhibitions, music and lecture events. Today, Villa Hecht is home to a psychiatric day clinic.

Art collection 
Helene Hecht had an art collection with valuable paintings. Provenance research which includes the Hecht collection has been undertaken by departments of painting and sculpture at Kunsthalle Mannheim.

Murder by Nazis 
Hecht was Jewish and when Hitler came to power in Germany in 1933, subject to Nazi anti-Jewish laws. At the age of 86, Helene Hecht was picked up by the police on the night of October 21–22, 1940, to be deported to the French internment camp of Gurs. She did not reach the destination alive.

Bankruptcy proceedings were imposed on the estate of Helene Hecht on June 17, 1941, and the furnishings of the Villa Hecht were auctioned off.

Tribute 
In Mannheim, a street was named after her, the Helene-Hecht-Ring.

Helene-Hecht-Prize 
Since 2009, the city of Mannheim has awarded a prize named after it to female artists every two years. The prize is endowed with 3,000 euros.

Publications 

 Unsere Reise nach Kleinasien und Griechenland im Frühjahr 1891. Mannheim 1891.

Literature 

 Barbara Becker: „In Mannheim habe ich an so viele Hübsche(s) und Schöne(s) zu denken …“ Helene Hecht – Ein Porträt mit Emotionen. In: Ilse Thomas, Sylvia Schraut (Hgg.): ZeitenWandel. Frauengenerationen in der Geschichte Mannheims. 1995, S. 278–291.
 Susanne Schlösser: Helene Hecht. In: Badische Biographien, Neue Folge, Bd. 6. Kommission für Geschichtliche Landeskunde, Stuttgart 2011, S. 177–178.

References 

1940 deaths
People who died in the Holocaust
Jewish art collectors
German Jews
Patrons of the visual arts
1854 births